Torsten Stiig Jansen (born July 24, 1963) is a Danish journalist. He has worked for Ekstra Bladet and DR as a foreign news reporter, US correspondent, Head of Foreign News and news presenter at TV Avisen. 
 In 2007, he left DR after being appointed Minister-Counsellor, cultural attaché at the Embassy of Denmark in Washington, D.C. He is currently associate partner at the public affairs bureau, LEAD Agency in Copenhagen.

While a young reporter for Ekstra Bladet in 1990–1993, Jansen covered the revolutions of 1989, the dissolution of the Soviet Union, 

the Bosnian Wars and the Siege of Sarajevo.  Based in Moscow for Ekstra Bladet, Jansen travelled extensively in Eastern Europe reporting on the 1991 Soviet coup d'état attempt against the last leader of the Soviet Union, Mikhail Gorbachev. He also covered the Rwandan genocide and the release of Nelson Mandela.

Jansen has co-written several books on American politics. In 2020, publishing house Gyldendal published Jansens book Sprækker on Danish-US relations told through interviews with all current living Danish Prime ministers.

Early life and career
Jansen was born in Virum, the son of associate professor Jytte (née Qvist) and manufacturer Lars Stiig Jansen. He was a resident of Søllerød. He enrolled at Virum Gymnasium in 1980–1983. He launched a short lived art gallery project in 1985 called "En Jansen og Nørgaard Udstilling" with his high school friend, fashion designer, Mads Nørgaard. He studied journalism at the Danish School of Journalism from 1986 to 1990.

Career
Jansen began his career as a foreign news journalist at the Danish tabloid 'Ekstra Bladet', travelling extensively in Eastern Europe covering the historical political changes beginning with the Revolutions of 1989 and the breakdown of the Berlin Wall. Together with Jan Grarup, war photographer Jansen reported on the Balkan Wars from Croatia, Serbia and Kosovo.

In 1992, Nelson Mandela was touring the Scandinavian countries thanking them for their support during his 27 years imprisonment at Robben Island, South Africa. Jansen interviewed Nelson Mandela as the only Scandinavian journalist, during Mandela's visit to Copenhagen, February 1992.

Jansen was appointed US Correspondent in 1996–2001 for DR. There, he covered the 1996 United States presidential election, the Clinton–Lewinsky scandal and the 2000 United States presidential election in Florida, the subsequent 2000 United States presidential election recount in Florida where the democratic presidential nominee Al Gore conceded to the republican presidential nominee George W. Bush.

Jansen later served as Head of Foreign News at DR from 2001 to 2004. In 2004–2007 he was a News presenter at TV Avisen. From 2007 to 2011, he served as Minister-Counsellor, cultural attaché at the Embassy of Denmark in Washington, D.C. with attention on  US–Danish climate relations leading up to the 2009 United Nations Climate Change Conference in Copenhagen, Denmark. While at the Danish Embassy in Washington, D.C., Jansen's office oversaw several royal visits by Frederik, Crown Prince of Denmark, Mary, Crown Princess of Denmark and one official US visit in 2011 by Margrethe II of Denmark and Henrik, Prince Consort of Denmark.

In 2013, Jansen joined the PR and Public Affairs Agency, LEAD Agency in Copenhagen, Denmark. He is serving on the board of Danish Shareholders/Dansk Aktionærforening since 2017.  He is a pundit on US politics at TV2 NEWS Denmark since 2019.

References 

20th-century Danish journalists
21st-century Danish journalists
Danish foreign correspondents
Danish television presenters
Cultural attachés
Living people
1963 births
People from Lyngby-Taarbæk Municipality